Mobile Safari is the third album by the Scottish band The Pastels, released in 1995.

Production
The album was recorded at Glasgow's Stuffhouse Studios and CAVA Sound Workshops. Dean Wareham contributed guitar to a few tracks.

"Flightpaths to Each Other" was also the name of an art exhibit organized by the band in 1994, in Glasgow.

Critical reception
AllMusic wrote that the band "stretched out to an American audience with their calm and reflective style of blissful indie pop." The Encyclopedia of Popular Music called the album "an enjoyable collection of ragamuffin odes to life in and outside of an underachieving indie band." Trouser Press wrote that the album "builds upon the Pastels’ oft-copied shambling pop sound, but rounds off some of the songs’ rough edges with fleshed-out arrangements and sensitive, clear production." Martin C. Strong called it "a wryly self-deprecating look at an indie band’s lot." Spin wrote that "this spacious record goes way beyond the shambly pop aesthetic with which the Pastels are associated."

Track listing
All songs written by Stephen McRobbie, except where noted.
"Exploration Team" (David Keegan, McRobbie) – 3:04
"Mandarin" (Katrina Mitchell) – 3:26
"Yoga" (McRobbie, Annabel Wright) – 4:17
"Mobile Deli" (Wright) – 1:32
"Exotic Arcade" – 2:58
"Classic Line-Up" – 3:17
"Flightpaths to Each Other" (Keegan, McRobbie) – 2:12
"Basement Scam" – 4:50
"Strategic Gear" – 1:52
"Token Collecting" (Mitchell) – 3:13
"Coolport" – 3:32
"Worlds of Possibility" (Wright, Mitchell, McRobbie) – 3:46

Personnel
 Stephen McRobbie (or Stephen Pastel) – guitar, vocals
 Katrina Mitchell – drums, vocals, percussion, keyboards, guitar
 Annabel Wright (or Aggi) – bass, vocals, keyboards, guitar, artwork
 David Keegan – guitar
 Dean Wareham – guitar
 Norman Blake – guitar, vocals, percussion
 Gerard Love – guitar, vocals
 Sarah Ward – flute
 Judi Mitchell – cor anglais
 Dawn Kelly – French horn
 Maureen Roberts – saxophone
 Luke Williams – trombone
 Darren Ramsay – trumpet
 Laura Mitchell – viola

References

External links
Mobile Safari at Domino Records

1995 albums
Domino Recording Company albums
The Pastels albums